The Ahnapee River is a  river on the Door Peninsula in eastern Wisconsin in the United States. It rises in Door County, Wisconsin, and flows through Kewaunee County into Lake Michigan at the city of Algoma. Its name has been ascribed as coming from the Ojibwe word aanapii meaning "when?".

Course
The Ahnapee rises in southern Door County and flows generally southeastwardly into northeastern Kewaunee County, past the village of Forestville, where it is dammed.  Downstream of Forestville the river becomes a freshwater estuary of Lake Michigan and is paralleled by a rail trail called the Ahnapee State Trail. It joins Lake Michigan at the city of Algoma. The length of the river from Forestville to Algoma has ten public access points.

Gallery

See also
List of Wisconsin rivers

References

External links
Wisconsin DNR page about Ahnapee River Wetlands, including photographs
 A Canoe Trip on the Ahnapee River with Herb Klein and Cal Holvenstadt, produced by Laddie Chapman, Sevastopol Channel 19, Saturday May 10, 2007
Ahnapee River Water Trail Interactive Tour Map

Rivers of Wisconsin
Bodies of water of Door County, Wisconsin
Bodies of water of Kewaunee County, Wisconsin